Aleksey Kobelev (born 27 July 1971) is a Russian biathlete. He competed in the men's sprint event at the 1998 Winter Olympics.

Biathlon results
All results are sourced from the International Biathlon Union.

Olympic Games

World Championships
4 medals (1 gold, 2 silver, 1 bronze)

*During Olympic seasons competitions are only held for those events not included in the Olympic program.
**Pursuit was added in 1997.

Individual victories
2 victories (2 Sp)

*Results are from UIPMB and IBU races which include the Biathlon World Cup, Biathlon World Championships and the Winter Olympic Games.

References

1971 births
Living people
Russian male biathletes
Olympic biathletes of Russia
Biathletes at the 1998 Winter Olympics
Sportspeople from Izhevsk